California State University, Long Beach (CSULB) is a public research university in Long Beach, California. The 322-acre campus is the second largest in the California State University system (CSU). The university is one of the largest in the state of California by enrollment with a student body numbering 39,435 for the fall 2021 semester. With 5,830 graduate students as of fall 2021, the university enrolls one of the largest graduate student populations across the CSU system and in the state of California. California State University, Long Beach is classified among "R2: Doctoral Universities – High research activity".

The university is home to one of the largest publicly funded art schools in the United States. The university currently operates with one of the lowest student tuition and mandatory fee rates in the country, at $5,742 per semester for full-time students with California residence as of 2021. CSULB is an Hispanic-serving institution (HSI) and is eligible to be designated as an Asian American Native American Pacific Islander serving institution (AANAPISI).

History

The college was established in 1949 by California Governor Earl Warren, to serve the rapidly expanding post-World War II population of Orange and Southern Los Angeles counties. Since then, CSULB has grown to become one of the state's largest universities.

The institution was first named as Los Angeles-Orange County State College. Peter Victor Peterson was its first president. It offered 25 courses, taught by 13 faculty members, in two apartment buildings at 5381 Anaheim Road in Long Beach. In June 1950, the citizens of Long Beach voted overwhelmingly to purchase  as a permanent campus for the college, then known as Long Beach State College. The purchase price was nearly $1 million. Student enrollment grew rapidly in this new, permanent location.

Carl W. McIntosh was named the college's second president in 1959. While McIntosh was president, the school grew tremendously. Enrollment surged from about 10,000 to more than 30,000, and he rapidly expanded and revamped the curriculum. McIntosh tripled the number of faculty and constructed 30 new buildings. Although the 1960s were a period of deep unrest on American college campuses, McIntosh's collegial governing style, gentle and quiet demeanor, and willingness to permit protest on campus (so long as it remained quiet and peaceful) helped keep Long Beach State College relatively quiet throughout the period. In 1964, LBSC changed its name to California State College at Long Beach. In 1967, the California state legislature revamped the state college system. It changed its name in 1968 to California State College, Long Beach, as part of these changes and began to be much more closely integrated into the California State College system. However, then as now, it is still called "Long Beach State" for short, especially in athletics.

In 1965, CSULB hosted the first International Sculpture Symposium to be held in the United States and the first such symposium to be held at a college or university. Six sculptors from abroad and two from the United States created many of the monumental sculptures present on the campus. The event received national media attention from newspapers around the country, including The New York Times, Los Angeles Times Magazine, Art in America and a six-page color spread in Fortune.

McIntosh departed for Montana State University in 1969, and was succeeded by President Steve Horn. The California State University Board of Trustees elevated the school to university status in 1972, along with 12 other state college campuses. The decision was made based on total enrollment, size of graduate programs, complexity and diversity of majors and number of doctorates held by faculty at each college. CSCLB thus became California State University, Long Beach, or CSULB.

Also in 1972, the campus became the home of the largest library facility in the then 19-campus CSU system: a modern six-story building with a seating capacity of nearly 4,000 students.

In 1995, President Robert Maxson initiated the privately funded President's Scholars Program, providing selected qualified California high school valedictorians and National Merit finalists and semi-finalists with a full four-year scholarship package, including tuition, a book stipend, and housing. , over 1000 students have accepted the scholarship. For applicants for fall 2010, National Achievement Program Semifinalists/Finalists and National Hispanic Recognition scholars were also considered.

In 2010, the University launched the Sunstone Innovation Challenge, an annual business plan competition seeking diverse teams to develop sustainable, entrepreneurial, and innovative ideas. The winning team receives funding and services worth $35,000.

In August 2020, CSULB unveiled its new shark mascot, Elbee, following a 2019 student-led process that selected the shark as Beach's new mascot. While Elbee is a shark, the university's Division I intercollegiate athletics program remains “Beach Athletics.”

As of 2022, the university was classified among "R2: Doctoral Universities – High research activity" in recognition of the university's evolution from a master's-level comprehensive institution to one that awards doctorates and conducts a significant amount of research.

Campus
It has its own U.S. Postal ZIP Code, 90840. CSULB is located at 1250 Bellflower Boulevard. It is bounded by East 7th Street to the south, East Atherton Street to the north, Bellflower Boulevard to the west, and Palo Verde Avenue to the east.

Architecture
The architecture of the campus is mostly of the International style (designed primarily by architect Edward Killingsworth) and is very minimalist, placing emphasis instead on the landscaping that surrounds it. This naturalistic, park-like layout has earned the campus numerous design awards, as well as other awards from gardening societies. Recent construction maintains the characteristic glass-and-brick style. The integration of landscaping and architecture is apparent at the school's theater complex, where a dense grove of ficus trees is planted in such a way that it forms a continuation of the pillar-supported canopy at the theater's entrance. The university's registration offices are located in the open courtyard of Brotman Hall, which is "roofed" by a similar jungle-like canopy. The Psychology building is also notable for its soaring, airy courtyard planted with tall Eucalyptus trees.

Campus landmarks

The University Student Union (USU) building is located at the center of campus.

It was completed in 2010. It includes facilities for fitness programs and aerobics classes, courts for volleyball, basketball, badminton, rock climbing walls, an indoor track, a student lounge, and much more. The center is funded and managed by CSULB's Associated Students, Incorporated (ASI).

49er basketball and volleyball games are currently played in the iconic, eighteen-story Walter Pyramid (formerly known as the Long Beach Pyramid) located on north campus. The Pyramid is a sporting complex that can accommodate over 5,000 fans, including temporary seating and standing room. Two sections of interior stands are fitted with large hydraulic lifts that can lift the seating elements 45 degrees into the air, creating room for five volleyball courts or three basketball courts. The Pyramid is home to the Southern California Summer Pro League, a noted showcase for current and prospective NBA basketball players.

The University Art Museum's permanent collection contains primarily abstract expressionist paintings, works on paper, and an outdoor sculpture garden that began in 1966. The UAM was the first accredited museum in the CSU system. In addition, the museum's Gordon F. Hampton collection is housed at the Downtown Los Angeles law offices of Sheppard Mullin.

The campus is also home to the Carpenter Performing Arts Center, a 1,074-seat theater named after CSULB alumni Richard and Karen Carpenter.

The Earl Burns Miller Japanese Garden is an artistic retreat of solitude and beauty. Among its many picturesque attractions, the Garden features a large pond populated with koi.

Puvungna

The campus is built on the ancient Tongva village and burial site known as Puvungna ("the place of the gathering" or "in the ball"), which is a sacred site for the Tongva and Acjachemen. In 1974, the now twenty-two acre site was added to the National Register of Historic Places after the site was uncovered in the development of the nearby Japanese Garden.

From 1992 to 1995, CSULB attempted to challenge this designation in order to commercially develop the site into a strip mall and student housing. The Tongva people filed a lawsuit and initiated a protest, which involved physically occupying the land day and night to stave off bulldozers even while threatened with arrest by campus officials.

In 2019, the university dumped dirt and debris onto the site and drove heavy equipment over the ground in the construction of a new student housing development. This was received negatively by the Tongva and Acjachemen, who organized in an attempt to preserve the site from future damage. The site remains a natural area with a few trees.

Campus sustainability

The university, in its push to support climate sustainability, installed solar panels on the Brotman Hall building and the Facilities Management canopy parking in 2007. The university has been taking steps in addressing the challenge of sustainability, with the support of its student government, student body, and organizations, such as the Environmental Science & Policy Club.

The Environmental Science & Policy Club (ES&P Club) has brought support to environmental awareness and sustainability through club activities, such as coastal clean-ups, hikes, plant-restoration project, tabling, conferences, guest speakers, & Kaleidoscope.  In 2006, the ES&P Club supported the installation of waterless urinals in the university's men's restrooms. The ES&P Club hosts an annual Earth Week celebration each April, including documentary screenings, discussions, and speaker series.

In addition, there has been a push in recent years to revive the organic gardens on campus, culminating in 2015 with the launch of the Grow Beach University Gardens, a student-led ASI sub-group that promotes organic gardening and sustainable agriculture on campus. The new garden boxes are part of a campus-wide effort to provide a natural, organic, and convenient garden right on campus for student and faculty use.

The university "has a comprehensive energy management program incorporating real-time metering and energy-saving technologies such as the EnergySaver, which provides a more sophisticated alternative to turning off the lights by automatically varying the voltage to the ballasted fixtures and reducing the power consumed, while maintaining appropriate lighting levels."

Desert Studies Center
The Desert Studies Center is a field station of the California State University located in Zzyzx, California in the Mojave Desert. The purpose of the center is to provide opportunities to conduct research, receive instruction and experience the Mojave Desert environment. It is operated by the California Desert Studies Consortium, a consortium of 7 CSU campuses: Fullerton, Cal Poly Pomona, Long Beach, San Bernardino, Northridge, Dominguez Hills and Los Angeles.

Academics

CSULB comprises three Liberal Arts colleges:
College of the Arts
College of Liberal Arts
College of Natural Sciences and Mathematics
and five vocational colleges:
College of Business
College of Education
College of Engineering
College of Health & Human Services
College of Continuing & Professional Education

Together, the colleges offer a total of 81 baccalaureate degrees, 67 master's degrees, 16 education-related credential programs, and three doctoral degrees (two joint and one independent).

Admissions
Fall freshman statistics
CSU Long Beach has become the most applied to campus in the California State University system, receiving over 102,000 applicants with a low acceptance rate of 28%, edging out San Diego State in number of applicants and Cal Poly San Luis Obispo (Cal Poly SLO) in percentage accepted.

Rankings

CSULB is ranked the No. 3 university in the nation for promoting social mobility, according to the most recent edition of the social mobility index by CollegeNET.

The 2021 edition of Washington Monthlys College Guide and Rankings list CSULB as the No. 2 Master's-level university in the nation.

Money Magazine's 2020 College rankings saw Cal State Long Beach ranked in the Top 1% for "Best Public College", "Four-Year Institutions Ranked By Value" and "Most Transformative Colleges." In 2022, Money positioned California State University, Long Beach 18th out of 600 four-year colleges universities in their Best Colleges in America list.

In 2021, The Wall Street Journal/Times Higher Education ranked CSULB 8th in the nation for Campus Diversity. The category ranking, called "environment" by the publication, assessed the percentage of Pell Grant recipients, the racial and ethnic diversity of students and faculty, and the proportion of students who come from outside the United States.

Student life

Campus publications

The university has three student publications: the Daily 49er, 22 West Magazine (formerly The Long Beach Union Newspaper) and DIG Magazine.

The first issue of the Daily 49er, the campus newspaper, was published on November 11, 1949. It publishes Monday through Thursday during the fall and spring semesters, and once weekly during the summer sessions. It was one of the first college newspapers in the country to have an Internet edition, starting in August 1994.

22 West Magazine, which is partially student-funded, and affiliated with ASI, publishes every month during fall and spring semesters. It began on April 22, 1977, when it was formed in response to the Daily 49er. The Union Weekly focuses on being an alternative voice on campus and features a satirical section called "The Grunion" (not to be confused with the Long Beach paper the Grunion Gazette). During the late 1970s through 1980s, the Union was a daily newspaper, giving heavy competition to the Daily 49er. Journalism majors who worked on the "Union" did so under a pseudonym as it was a practice forbidden by the dean of the Journalism department.

DIG Magazine, the campus magazine, has gone through many changes throughout the years. It started off as The Lantern, a magazine for night-time students, before transforming to UniverCity in 1973. Then, it turned into University Magazine. In the early 2000s, the magazine transformed to DIG Magazine as a music magazine before transitioning to a general art & culture magazine. Today, the magazine features interesting people and groups within the community, and discusses topics that concern students' interests.

KKJZ 88.1 FM
The California State University Long Beach Foundation owns the KKJZ non-commercial broadcast license of 88.1 FM, a jazz and blues radio station. Global Jazz, Inc., an affiliate of Mount Wilson FM Broadcasters, Inc., programs and manages the radio station. In 2015, Global Jazz moved the station thirty miles from Long Beach to West Los Angeles. While KKJZ began as a radio station exclusively playing Jazz and Blues music it has recently expanded its playlist to include Rhythm and Blues artists.

22 West Radio22 West Radio is a free format, student run internet radio station at CSU, Long Beach. It is also an HD Radio station via 88.1 HD3 . The radio station is operated year-round. The station has been around in various forms since the mid-1970s, then known as KSUL (which went defunct after 1981). 22 West Radio is a department of Associated Students, Incorporated at CSULB and is both funded and regulated by them.

Pow Wow
Each March since 1970, the university has hosted the largest pow-wow in Southern California. This free two-day event, which attracts more than 6,000 persons each year, features Native American dancing, arts, craft and native foods.

Student Recreation and Wellness Center
The $70 million Student Recreation and Wellness Center is located on the northeast side of campus. It opened in fall 2010.

Greek life – sororities and fraternities

Eight national sororities on campus are governed by the Panhellenic Association and are members of the National Panhellenic Conference. Eleven general fraternities are members of and governed by the Interfraternity Council. There is also a Cultural Greek Council which governs over six sororities, six fraternities and one co-ed fraternity. Within the last 5 years, two fraternities have been removed for various instances of sexual assault and misconduct, specifically Sigma Alpha Epsilon and Sigma Chi. The latter's expulsion was not made known to the university community, causing controversy within the student body.

Student housing
CSULB provides housing to accommodate 3,000 students:Beachside Village – Off-site student housing with 2 buildings (Pacific, Atlantic), a dining hall and a pool.Hillside Village – 9 buildings (A, B, C, D, E, F, International House, Los Cerritos, Los Alamitos) with dining hall.Parkside Village''' – 10 buildings (G, H, J, K, L, M, N, P, Q, Parkside North) with dining hall.

Athletics

Long Beach State competes in NCAA Division I in 18 sports teams and plays competitively in baseball, cross country, softball, track and field, women's tennis, and women's soccer, as well as both men's and women's basketball, volleyball, water polo and golf teams. The university is a founding member of the Big West Conference, and also competes in the Mountain Pacific Sports Federation for sports not sponsored by the Big West.

In the realm of sports the school is branded as "Long Beach State." "Beach", which had long been unofficially used to refer to Long Beach State and its sports teams as it is the only university on the West Coast with the word "Beach" in its name, became the official athletic program brand name in the 2020–21 school year. One can see the cheer "Go Beach!" written on many CSULB products around campus and on the large water tower near the entrance to the campus.

The school colors have been black and gold since 2000, when they were changed by a student referendum (after George Allen changed the football uniform colors) from the original brown and gold.

Long Beach State is home to one of the top women's volleyball teams in the nation. Long Beach State has won three national titles in women's volleyball, in 1989, 1993 and 1998. The 1998 women's team was the first team in NCAA Division I history to have an undefeated season. The team's most famous alumna is Misty May-Treanor, who won three Olympic gold medals in Beach Volleyball in 2004, 2008, and 2012. Long Beach is also the only California State University to participate in the Golden Coast Conference for Men's Water polo not sponsored by the Big West Conference the Division Long Beach participates for in NCAA Division I.

Because of the proximity to California State University, Fullerton, the schools are considered rivals. The rivalry is especially heated in baseball with the Long Beach State baseball team also having a competitive college baseball program.

Notable people

CSULB has more than 320,000 alumni .

Alumni have written, acted and directed screenplays that have attracted Oscar-caliber talent. David Twohy (BA) co-wrote the screenplay for the Academy Award winning film The Fugitive. Linda Woolverton (BA 1974) wrote the screenplays for the Academy Award-winning,Beauty and the Beast was nominated for Best Picture and five other Academy Awards, and won for Best Original Score and Best Original Song Disney animated films Beauty and the Beast and The Lion King, and the live-action 2010 film Alice in Wonderland directed by Oscar-nominated director Tim Burton and starring Oscar-nominated actor Johnny Depp. J. F. Lawton (BA) wrote the screenplay to Pretty Woman, starring the Oscar-winning actress Julia Roberts. Mark Steven Johnson (BA 1989) has co-written and directed the films Daredevil, starring Oscar-winning actor Ben Affleck, and Ghost Rider, starring Oscar-winning actor Nicolas Cage. Actor Crispin Alapag notably on Big Time In Hollywood FL, Ray Donovan, General Hospital and VR Troopers Power Rangers.

Current and former mayors of Long Beach Robert Garcia and Beverly O'Neill are alumni.

Former students have won at least five Academy Awards. Steven Spielberg (Class of 1969, BA 2002) won two Oscars for Best Directing for Schindler's List and Saving Private Ryan and has directed a number of other successful movies such as Jaws, E.T. the Extra-Terrestrial, and Jurassic Park. Former industrial design major John Dykstra, who has been nominated five times for Academy Awards, won two Oscars for his special effects work on the George Lucas film Star Wars and the Sam Raimi film Spider-Man 2. Deborah L. Scott (BA) won an Oscar for costume design for the James Cameron film Titanic.

Emmy Award-nominated director Chris Carter (BA 1979) created the series The X-Files, which garnered several awards during its nine seasons on television. Former student Steve Martin, whose philosophy classes at the university inspired him to become a professional comedian, is an Emmy Award winner and a Disney Legend.

Alumni and former students have also participated in the world of sports. Jason Giambi, Evan Longoria, Troy Tulowitzki, Harold Reynolds, Jered Weaver, Steve Trachsel, and Jason Vargas have all been selected to play in the Major League Baseball All Stars games. Matt Duffy won the World Series with the 2014 San Francisco Giants and continues to play with the Los Angeles Angels. Jeff McNeil of the New York Mets won the 2022 NL batting title with an average of .326. Golfer Mark O'Meara (BA 1980) won the Masters Tournament and The Open Championship. Craig Hodges is a two-time NBA Champion, Terrell Davis is a two-time Super Bowl champion and Pro Football Hall of Fame inductee, and Billy Parks played five seasons in the NFL. Diver Pat McCormick won four gold medals in two consecutive Olympics (Helsinki and Melbourne), and Misty May-Treanor (BS 2002) won three gold medals in women's beach volleyball in three other consecutive Olympics (Athens, Beijing, and London). High Jumper Dwight Stones set the World Record while a student at Cal State Long Beach, in addition to winning the bronze medal at both the 1972 Olympic Games in Munich and 1976 in Montreal. Track and Field athlete Bill Green (BA 1984) set the United States and NCAA record three times in the hammer throw, and placed 5th at the 1984 Olympic Games in Los Angeles.

Former students Karen Carpenter and Richard Carpenter (Class of 1972, Honorary Doctorate 2000) of the Carpenters are the namesakes of the Carpenter Performing Arts Center, a 1,065-seat performance hall on the campus of the university that also houses an exhibit on the Carpenters. Richard Carpenter's college instructor and choir director Frank Pooler inspired him in choral arrangement, and both Karen and Richard participated in Pooler's choir. Pooler also introduced Richard to fellow undergraduate and future song-writing collaborator John Bettis. Another undergraduate, Wesley Jacobs, would join the Carpenters as a musical instrumentalist. The Carpenters sold over 100 million records, won three Grammy Awards out of eighteen nominations, and created numerous gold and platinum albums.

Notes

References

BibliographyTeacher Education Programs in the United States: A Guide.'' Westport, Conn.: Praeger, 2004.

External links

Long Beach State Athletics website

 
Long Beach
California State University, Long Beach
Educational institutions established in 1949
1949 establishments in California
Education in Long Beach, California
School buildings on the National Register of Historic Places in California
Universities and colleges in Los Angeles County, California
Schools accredited by the Western Association of Schools and Colleges
Buildings and structures on the National Register of Historic Places in Los Angeles County, California